Malcolm John Charles Harbour, CBE (born 19 February 1947), is a British Conservative Party politician who was a  Member of the European Parliament (MEP) for the West Midlands between 1999 and July 2014.  He is a member of the European Conservatives and Reformists Group and the chairman of the Committee on Internal Market and Consumer Protection.

Education and qualifications
Harbour was educated at Bedford School (1960–64), Trinity College, Cambridge (1964–67) where he graduated in engineering, and at Aston University (1967–70) where he gained a diploma in management studies. In July 2008 he was awarded an honorary DSc by Aston University for services to science, technology and the European Union.

Motor industry
Harbour spent 32 years in the motor industry, as an engineer, a senior commercial executive, a consultant and a researcher. In 1992 he became a founding director of the International Car Distribution Programme and in 1998 initiated the 3DayCar Programme, studying the reconfiguration of the automotive supply chain. He began his motor industry career in the BMC Longbridge Plant as an Austin Engineering apprentice in 1967. After working as a design and development engineer, he spent eight years planning and managing new product programmes in the Rover Triumph Division. In 1980 he became Strategic Planning Director for Austin Rover, in 1982 Marketing Director, in 1984 UK Sales Director and 1986 Overseas Sales Director. In 1989, he jointly founded the specialist consultants Harbour Wade Brown.

European Parliament
Harbour became an active member of the Conservative Party in 1972. He first stood for the European Parliament in 1989 in the constituency of Birmingham East but failed to win election. He missed out again in 1994, before finally, in 1999, being placed high on the Conservative list for the new multi-member West Midlands region constituency, ensuring his election in the 1999 European Parliament election. He was re-elected in June 2004 and 2009. He is one of three Conservative members representing the West Midlands Region of the UK. He is chairman of the Committee on Internal Market and Consumer Protection and is a Member of the European Conservatives and Reformists Group. He is vice-chairman of the Parliament's Science and Technology Options Assessment Panel (STOA) and a Member of the Inter-Parliamentary Delegation to Japan. Harbour takes a special interest in the EU Single Market, industry, science and technology policy. He is chairman of the European Manufacturing Forum, the Ceramics Industry Forum and the Conservative Technology Forum. He is a governor of the European Internet Foundation. He has been the lead MEP (rapporteur) for major legislation on Telecoms, the Single Market and Motor Vehicle standards. Since 2005, he has served on the CARS 21 High Level Group, a Europe-wide initiative to boost the automotive industry. He was named as a top 50 European of 2006 for his key role in broking agreement on the Services Directive. In May 2006, he was named the UK's most Small Business Friendly UK Parliamentarian by members of the Forum of Private Business. In September 2010, he was voted Internal Market MEP of the Year.

Harbour was appointed Commander of the Order of the British Empire (CBE) in the 2013 New Year Honours for services to the British economy.

Personal life
Harbour married his wife, Penny, in 1969. He has two daughters, Louise and Katy, and four grandchildren. He lives in Solihull. His interests include travel, cooking, choral singing and motor racing.

Footnotes

External links
 Profile on European Parliament website
 Detailed information on his work
 MEP Malcolm Harbour backs Birmingham Post's Jaguar Land Rover campaign
 FFII view
 https://web.archive.org/web/20090323004422/http://blog.ldv.com/blogs/ldvblog.nsf/dx/malcolm-harbour-mep-electric-maxus-test-drive.htm?opendocument&comments
FFII UK Malcolm Harbour and software patents
FFII on Malcolm Harbour
Malcolm Harbour — updated wiki page
 Profile on European Internet Foundation website

1947 births
Living people
People educated at Bedford School
Alumni of Trinity College, Cambridge
Alumni of Aston University
Conservative Party (UK) MEPs
MEPs for England 1999–2004
MEPs for England 2004–2009
MEPs for England 2009–2014
Commanders of the Order of the British Empire